Ramcat Historic District, also known as the Schuylkill Historic District, is a national historic district located in the Rittenhouse Square West neighborhood of Philadelphia, Pennsylvania. It encompasses 613 contributing buildings.  It includes a mix of transportation-related, residential, and industrial properties.  The mid- to late-19th century housing stock is characterized as two-story, rowhouse dwellings for the working class.  Notable non-residential buildings include the Wanamaker delivery garage, Gimbel's delivery garage, Lanston Monotype Co., Lippincott and Co. Press Building, Thornton-Fuller Auto Assembly Plant (1925), Crane Ice Cream Co. (1904, 1914), and the New York Pie Baking Co.

It was added to the National Register of Historic Places in 1986.

References

Buildings and structures on the National Register of Historic Places in Philadelphia
Historic districts in Philadelphia
Rittenhouse Square, Philadelphia
Historic districts on the National Register of Historic Places in Pennsylvania